"Earache/Pass The Time" is an EP by A Global Threat.  It was released on March 13, 2003, on CD and 7" vinyl on Rodent Popsicle Records.  Their sound has changed again since 2002's Here We Are, this release being closer to the style of their following album Where The Sun Never Sets.

Track listing 
Side A

Side B

Personnel 
 Bryan Lothian - vocals and guitar
 John Curran - bass guitar and vocals
 Mike Graves - drums

References

A Global Threat albums
2003 EPs